Matthew Lutton (born 28 July 1984) is an Australian theatre and opera director.

Early life and training
Lutton was born at Perth, Western Australia. He attended Perth's Hale School, graduating in 2001. From 2002 to 2004 he studied Theatre Arts at the Western Australian Academy of Performing Arts, and in 2011 relocated to Melbourne.

Theatre 
In 2002 Matthew Lutton formed the ThinIce theatre company which staged Ionesco's The Bald Prima Donna at the 2003 Perth International Fringe Festival. For ThinIce he directed the premiere of Brendan Cowell's play Bed at Perth Institute of Contemporary Arts and devised two new works with Eamon Flack, The Gathering in 2005 and The Goose Chase in 2007. The Goose Chase was a solo piece for Eamon Flack, co-produced with Deckchair Theatre.

Lutton was appointed the Artistic Director of Black Swan Theatre Company's emerging artists' program at the BSX-Theatre in 2003 where, between 2003 and 2006, he directed Harold Pinter's Mountain Language, Mrozek's Striptease, Büchner's Woyzeck and Dürrenmatt's The Visit. He became the Associate Director of the Black Swan Theatre Company in 2006, and in 2007 directed Mishima's The Lady Aoi for the Perth International Arts Festival.
 
In 2008 Lutton was Michael Kantor's Assistant Director on Malthouse Theatre's production of Moliere’s Tartuffe in Melbourne. Kantor fell ill two days before rehearsals commenced and Lutton was invited to take over the production as director. He then went on to direct the world premiere of Tom Holloway's play Don’t Say the Words at Sydney's Griffin Theatre Company and Red Shoes (a version of the Hans Christian Andersen story adapted by Humphrey Bower) for ThinIce and Artrage.

In 2009 ThinIce was appointed triennial funding from both the Australia Council for the Arts and ArtsWA. Over the next three years ThinIce created six new works in partnership with other Australian arts organizations. These included a new production of Antigone (adapted by Eamon Flack and featuring singer Rachael Dease) with the Perth International Arts Festival; The Duel (a Dostoevsky adaptation written by Tom Wright) with Sydney Theatre Company; Tom Holloway's Love Me Tender with Belvoir Street Theatre and Griffin Theatre Company; The Trial (adapted from the Kafka novel by Louise Fox) with Sydney Theatre Company and Malthouse Theatre; and Die Winterreise with Malthouse Theatre and the Brisbane Festival. During this time, ThinIce and Lutton also developed work with Bell Shakespeare and Sydney Dance Company. The same year Lutton directed part one of The Mysteries: Genesis at Sydney Theatre Company. Parts two and three were directed by Tom Wright and Andrew Upton.

Lutton was appointed as the Associate Artist (Directing) at Melbourne's Malthouse Theatre in 2011, which initiated his decision to close down ThinIce and relocated to Melbourne. ThinIce was officially disestablished in April 2012.

Opera 
In 2007 Lutton attended the Jerwood Opera Writing Foundation Program, directed by Giorgio Battistelli, at the Aldeburgh Festival in England. While at Aldeburgh he collaborated with Czech composer Miroslav Srnka for the first time. In 2008 Srnka and Lutton received fellowships from the Jerwood Foundation and Aldeburgh Music to create a new opera, Make No Noise, commissioned by the Bavarian State Opera. The opera, with a libretto by Tom Holloway, is based on Isabel Coixet's film The Secret Life of Words, and had its world premiere at the Munich Opera Festival on 1 July 2011.

In 2012 Lutton directed Strauss's Elektra for West Australian Opera, Opera Australia, ThinIce, and Perth International Arts Festival, with Danish soprano Eva Johansson singing the title role.

Awards 
 2003 – Best Production at the Perth International Fringe Festival for The Bald Prima Donna
 2005 – Best Production at the Equity Guild Awards for The Visit
 2005 – Young West Australian of the Year for Arts
 2007 – ArtsWA Young People and the Arts Fellowship
 2010 – Western Australia Citizen of the Year: Youth Arts
 2011 – State Finalist Young Australian of the Year 2011: Western Australia

References

Further reading
 Laurie, Victoria: "The Face: Matthew Lutton", The Australian, 2009

Australian theatre directors
1984 births
Living people